Stefan Holt (born c. 1986/1987) is an American journalist and television news anchor for WMAQ-TV the Chicago flagship station of NBC-TV. He anchors alongside Marion Brooks and Allison Rosati for the 4 p.m. and 10 p.m. news programs for the station.

Early life 
Holt was born in Chicago, Illinois. His father, Lester Holt, was the main anchor for WBBM-TV in that city. His mother, Carol Hagen, had worked as a flight attendant.

Holt is a 2009 graduate of Pepperdine University in Malibu, California. During his college years, he interned at KABC-TV in Los Angeles and NBC News in London.

Career 
Holt began his career at WPBF, the ABC-TV affiliate in West Palm Beach, Florida, as a reporter and anchor.

In 2011, Holt moved to NBC's Chicago TV station WMAQ as a reporter and anchor. Eight months later he was named weekday news anchor for the 4:30 am – 7am newscast.

Holt was named anchor of the 4 pm newscast on WNBC-TV in New York in 2016. In 2017, Holt added duties as anchor of WNBC's 11 pm news. He took over from long-time anchor Chuck Scarborough.

On August 19, 2020, Holt announced on Twitter that he will be returning to WMAQ in Chicago after four years at WNBC. He will be the 4pm and 10pm anchor. He made his debut on October 12. David Ushery replaced Holt on WNBC's newscasts. His last day at WNBC was September 25, 2020.

Personal life 
Holt met his wife, Morgan, while both were attending Pepperdine University. They married at the college in 2012. In 2017, the couple announced the birth of their son, Henry, in New York City.

Holt's father, Lester Holt, is the anchor of NBC Nightly News and Dateline NBC. His mother, Carol Hagen-Holt, is a New York City real estate agent.

References 

American television hosts
American television reporters and correspondents
NBC News people
Journalists from New York City
Pepperdine University alumni
Television anchors from Chicago
1980s births
Year of birth uncertain
Living people
People from Chicago